Colonel Timothy Shaler Williams (August 1, 1862 - June 3, 1930) was an American journalist, and later president of the Brooklyn Rapid Transit Company.

Biography
He was born on August 1, 1862 in Ithaca, New York to Frances Henrietta Grant and Howard Cornelius Williams.  He worked as a journalist for a New York City newspaper from 1884 to 1889.  He was private secretary to two  New York governors, David Bennett Hill and Roswell Pettibone Flower . He married Alice Williams on October 31, 1895.  In 1895 he joined the Brooklyn Rapid Transit Company and was president from 1911 until his retirement in 1923.  He died on June 3, 1930 in Manhattan, New York City from heat stroke.

References

Deaths from hyperthermia
1862 births
1930 deaths